(born November 16, 1975) is a Japanese actress, and a popular 1990s idol, model and singer.

Biography
Uchida was born in Tokyo. She practiced fencing in high school, and ranked 3rd in a tournament in Tokyo in 1991.

She began her career as a model in commercials, notably for the confectionery company Lotte (ロッテ), then debuted in acting in 1992 in the drama Sono Toki, Heart wa Nusumareta. She became a swimsuit model for the swimwear company Unitika in 1993, and got popular as an idol, partly due to her then unusual tomboyish look with short hair and husky voice. She began to get large exposure in commercials and media, and hosted her own weekly 30mn late radio show, Yozora ni YOUKISS!, from April 1994 to March 2001 on Nippon Broadcasting.

She released her first single at the end of 1994, "TENCA wo Torou!", theme of one of her dramas, which ranked number 1 in the Oricon music charts, the first time for a solo debuting female singer, with a record of sales in this category only topped by Erika Sawajiri's debut single 12 years later. She went on a successful singing career for the next two years, her first album ranking number 1, with hits written by Tetsuya Komuro (notably "Only You" and "Baby's Growing Up"), a career which she stopped in 2000 to concentrate on acting.

She was cast in many dramas and movies, often as the lead actress, most notably in the live movies adaptations of the famous manga Hana yori dango (Boys over Flowers) (as Makino) in 1995, and Cat's Eye (as Ai) in 1997. She retired from show business when she married actor Hidetaka Yoshioka on November 28, 2002, but returned to acting in 2006, after her divorce in December 2005. After ten years away from the big screen, she made her comeback to cinema in 2007, in Takeshi Kitano's "Kantoku Banzai!", and in the leading role of "Welcome to the Quiet Room", movie set in a psychiatric hospital, in which she appears in all the scenes. Since 2012, she has played anesthesiologist Hiromi Jonouchi in the popular medical drama, Doctor-X Surgeon Michiko Daimon.

Filmography

Movies

TV movie

Drama

Dubbing
Ant-Man (2015), Hope van Dyne (Evangeline Lilly)
Ant-Man and the Wasp (2018), Hope van Dyne / Wasp (Evangeline Lilly)
Avengers: Endgame (2019), Hope van Dyne / Wasp (Evangeline Lilly)
Ant-Man and the Wasp: Quantumania (2023), Hope van Dyne / Wasp (Evangeline Lilly)

Discography

Albums

Singles

Others
Concert videos

Other videos

Photobooks

Radio

References

External links
Official profile at Burning Production 

Actresses from Tokyo
Japanese female models
Japanese film actresses
Japanese television actresses
Japanese women pop singers
Japanese idols
Living people
1975 births
Singers from Tokyo
20th-century Japanese actresses
20th-century Japanese singers
20th-century Japanese women singers
21st-century Japanese actresses
21st-century Japanese singers
21st-century Japanese women singers
King Records (Japan) artists